No More Parades may refer to:
No More Parades (novel), a novel by Ford Madox Ford
"No More Parades," a song by Son Volt from their 1997 album Straightaways